WLCM (1390 AM) is a commercial Christian radio station located in Charlotte, Michigan.  WLCM operates from two locations.  During the day it broadcasts with 5,000 watts from Charlotte.  Beginning on December 29, 2008, WLCM began operating with its new 4,500 watt night-time transmitter located in Holt, Michigan, on Lansing's south side.  It now can be heard throughout the Lansing, Michigan area both day and night.  The station is owned by the Christian Broadcasting System which is in turn owned by Jon Yinger.

The station was founded by McLean and Craig Davids as WCER. It began broadcasting from studios just west of town on August 25, 1956. The call letters stood for Charlotte and Eaton Rapids.  WCER was a typical small town station with MOR music, local news and features. WCER's FM station at 92.7 later became the original frequency of legendary classic rocker WMMQ, and is now WLMI at 92.9.

In 1979 WCER-FM switched to an automated Adult Contemporary format with the call sign WMMQ.  The following year the AM station was sold to Sharon Communications and the call sign became WGWY.  The call letters stood for Where God Wants You and the station had a contemporary religious format. In 1983, the format changed to traditional Christian music. Throughout both formats, the programming included the Farm Report, which gave grain, livestock, and other agricultural pricing and news; local news and sports that included live, on-site broadcasts; music; weather readings from ticker-tape; regional, state, and national news from ticker-tape; and music spun from vinyl 78s and 45s, as well as from 8-track cassettes. Pre-programmed shows purchased from sources such as National Public Radio member stations, were played both from 8-track cassettes as well as from live-stream. Non-musical advertisements were written and performed by staff, which included everyone from the station manager to the receptionist. Air time for the AM station was from 4:00 a.m. to 9:00 p.m. Throughout this time period, the WGWY and WMMQ shared facilities at the Charlotte studio, although the stations were separately owned and operated.

In 1986 the FM call sign was changed to WLNF.

ERC Media purchased the station in 1992 and began a short-lived country music format with the call sign WNNY. The next year the station was purchased by Jon Yinger who switched it back to a religious format as WLCM.  WLCM stands for Lansing's Christian Messenger.

Programming for the station comes from the Christian Broadcasting System and includes a mix of programs aimed at a conservative Christian audience.  Along with standard Christian programs like Focus on the Family, it also airs more mainstream programs of The Dave Ramsey Show.

WLCM is an affiliate of the Notre Dame Fighting Irish football radio network.

Sources 
Michiguide.com - WLCM History
Diane Faulkner, on-air pseudonym at WGWY, Kaye Quinn, was one of the broadcasters on WGWY from 1982 through 1983 and is now a broadcaster at 89.9 WJCT's Radio Reading Service, a National Public Radio affiliate, in Jacksonville, Florida.

External links

LCM-FM
Radio stations established in 1956
1956 establishments in Michigan
LCM-FM